The 2007–08 Cornell Big Red men's basketball team represented Cornell University in the 2007–08 college basketball season. This was coach Steve Donahue's 8th season at Cornell. The Big Red compete in the Ivy League and played their home games at Newman Arena. They went 14–0 in Ivy League play to win the championship and received the league's automatic bid to the 2008 NCAA Division I men's basketball tournament. They received a 14 seed in the South region. They were beaten by No. 3 seed Stanford in the first round to finish their season at 22–6.

Roster

Source

Schedule and results
Source
All times are Eastern

|-
!colspan=9 style=| Non-conference regular season

|-
!colspan=9 style=| Ivy League Regular Season

|-
!colspan=10 style=| NCAA tournament

Awards and honors
Louis Dale – Ivy League Player of the Year

References

Cornell
Cornell Big Red men's basketball seasons
Cornell
Cornell
Cornell